Liam McFarlane (born December 30, 1985 in Medicine Hat, Alberta) is a Canadian short track speed skater. McFarlane was a part of the relay team that won gold for Canada at the 2012 World Short Track Speed Skating Championships.

References

External links
 Canadian Speed Skating Profile

1985 births
Living people
Canadian male short track speed skaters
Universiade medalists in short track speed skating
Sportspeople from Medicine Hat
Sportspeople from Alberta
Universiade silver medalists for Canada
Competitors at the 2011 Winter Universiade
21st-century Canadian people